Anapogonia is a monotypic genus of  dwarf orb-weavers found on Java containing the single species, Anapogonia lyrata. Only the male of the species is known, described by Eugène Louis Simon in 1905. Every other species placed here has been moved to other genera, including Caledanapis, Maxanapis, and Spinanapis.

See also
 List of Symphytognathidae species

References

Monotypic Araneomorphae genera
Spiders of Asia
Symphytognathidae